Tony Eastley is an Australian newspaper journalist and radio and television newsreader and host

Journalism career
Eastley began his journalism career in the 1970s with The Examiner newspaper in Launceston, Tasmania before joining the Australian Broadcasting Corporation in 1979.

With the ABC he spent stints in Singapore and Hong Kong as a foreign correspondent.

After returning to Australia he presented ABC TV's breakfast news.

From 2002 to 2003 he was the newsreader of the NSW ABC-TV 7pm news, having taken over from long-standing newsreader Richard Morecroft. He is now the presenter of the local radio news and current affairs programme AM. He is based in Sydney.

In January 2014, Eastley resigned from AM to become senior presenter on ABC News 24. Chris Uhlmann was announced as his replacement.

In June 2016, Eastley retired from the Australian Broadcasting Corporation after 37 years.

Personal life
Eastley is married and has two children.

References

Australian radio personalities
Radio in Sydney
ABC News (Australia) presenters
Living people
Year of birth missing (living people)